Russell House may refer to:

in Canada
 Russell House (Ottawa), a historic former hotel in Ottawa, Ontario

in the United States
(by state then city)
Russell Family Historic District, Alexander City, Alabama, listed on the National Register of Historic Places (NRHP) in Tallapoosa County 
John Russell House, Fordyce, Arkansas, listed on the NRHP in Dallas County
Russell House (Pine Bluff, Arkansas), formerly listed on the NRHP in Jefferson County
Russell-Williamson House, Yuma, Arizona, listed on the NRHP in Yuma County
Russell-Graves House, Arvada, Colorado, listed on the NRHP in Jefferson County
Edward Augustus Russell House, Middletown, Connecticut, listed on the NRHP at Wesleyan University in Middlesex County
Samuel Wadsworth Russell House, Middletown, Connecticut, a National Historic Landmark and listed on the NRHP in Middlesex County
William Russell House (Lewes, Delaware), listed on the NRHP in Sussex County
Judge Willis Russell House, Brooksville, Florida, listed on the NRHP in Hernando County
Russell Homeplace Historic District, Russell, Georgia, listed on the NRHP in Barrow County
Rensselaer Russell House, Waterloo, Iowa, listed on the NRHP in Black Hawk County
Horn-Vincent-Russell Estate, Mission Hills, Kansas, listed on the NRHP in Johnson County
Russell Court, La Grange, Kentucky, listed on the NRHP in Oldham County
Russell House (Andover, Massachusetts), listed on the NRHP in Essex County
Jason Russell House, Arlington, Massachusetts, listed on the NRHP in Middlesex County
Bartlett-Russell-Hedge House, Plymouth, Massachusetts, listed on the NRHP in Plymouth County
Philemon Russell House, Somerville, Massachusetts, listed on the NRHP in Middlesex County
Susan Russell House, Somerville, Massachusetts, listed on the NRHP in Middlesex County
The Russell (Worcester, Massachusetts), listed on the NRHP in Worcester County
Arthur H. Russell House, Winchester, Massachusetts, listed on the NRHP in Middlesex County
Charles Russell House (Winchester, Massachusetts), listed on the NRHP in Middlesex County
William Russell House (Crystal Falls, Michigan), listed on the NRHP in Iron County
The Russell (Detroit, Michigan)
Williamson-Russell-Rahilly House, Lake City, Minnesota, listed on the NRHP in Wabasha County
Russell's House at Corinthn, Mississippi, salient in the Civil War battle of the Siege of Corinthn.
Charlie and Nancy Russell Honeymoon Cabin, Cascade, Montana, listed on the NRHP in Cascade County
Charles M. Russell House and Studio, Great Falls, Montana, listed on the NRHP in Cascade County
Russell-Colbath House, Albany, New Hampshire, listed on the NRHP in Carroll County
Charles B. Russell House, Cincinnati, Ohio, listed on the NRHP in Hamilton County
Mark Russell House, Riverlea, Ohio, listed on the NRHP in Franklin County
Russell House (Bedford, Pennsylvania), listed on the NRHP in Bedford County
Joseph and William Russell House, in Providence, Rhode Island, listed on the NRHP in Providence County
Nathaniel Russell House, Charleston, South Carolina, listed on the NRHP in Charleston County
Russell House (Mountain Rest, South Carolina), listed on the NRHP in Oconee County
Evans-Russell House, Spartanburg, South Carolina, listed on the NRHP in Spartanburg County
Russell-Heath House, Stoneboro, SC, listed on the NRHP in Kershaw County
Avery Russell House, Farragut, Tennessee, listed on the NRHP in Knox County
Russell House (Springfield, Tennessee), listed on the NRHP in Robertson County
Russell-Lackey-Prater House, Louisville, Tennessee, listed on the NRHP in Blount County
Russell-Arnold House, Lufkin, Texas, listed on the NRHP in Angelina County
Russell House (South Bend, Washington), listed on the NRHP in Pacific County
Charles W. Russell House, Wheeling, West Virginia, listed on the NRHP in Ohio County

See also
The Russell (disambiguation)
Charles Russell House (disambiguation)
William Russell House (disambiguation)
Russell School (disambiguation)